Maverick! : The Success Story Behind the World's Most Unusual Workplace is a business autobiography by Ricardo Semler published in 1993 by Warner Books.  The book relates the management succession and increasingly unorthodox ethos of Semco, which grew to become one of Brazil's largest conglomerates.

First published in Brazil in 1988 as Turning the Tables, it became the all-time best-selling nonfiction book in Brazil's history.  Semler further described the unusual corporate transition in The Seven-Day Weekend: Changing the Way Work Works published in 2003.

Synopsis
Maverick! is the autobiography of a businessman, Ricardo Semler, and the business he managed, Semco, one of Brazil's largest conglomerates.  Semler is the son of an entrepreneur who entered the family business and transformed it into a multibillion-dollar business empire. What is unusual is the way he developed management, labour relations and the work environment to achieve these goals. His radical policies are summed up as cartoons in a 'Semco Lexicon' and a 'Survival Manual' for the employees. Starting out as a manufacturing company, Semco allowed its workers to set their own production quotas and found that employees would voluntarily work overtime to meet them. Profit sharing is practiced right down to factory floor level, instead of large bonuses only for senior management. The company seeks to streamline and simplify processes and avoid complicated business regulations. Semler created an environment, which can essentially work without him and it made Maverick! into a worldwide bestseller.

Semco Lexicon
Bosses: Greater work participation led to a decrease in supervisors by 75%. Corporate staff offering accounting, marketing and legal expertise was reduced to the manufacturing units, while the quality control, processing and training departments were eradicated.

Circular Organization: The former hierarchical twelve-layer bureaucracy was changed into three concentric circle layers. Counsellors form the inner circle and manage the general policies and strategies of the company. Partners form the second level and run the business units.  Co-ordinators represent the first-level of management of each unit and Associates are all other employees of the company, together they form the outer circle.

Clean-outs: Semco shuts down twice a year, when all employees together have to clean-out their work place, to dispose old documents and machinery.

Corruption: There is no tolerance whatsoever for corruption.

Democracy: Representative democracy takes place through the factory committees, while for important decisions each employee has one direct vote.

Factory Committees: Each business unit of Semco (except the management) elects representatives to serve on committees, while it is ensured that the workers’ union is also included. The committees meet with the top managers of each unit on a regular basis in order to discuss work-related policies and aspects of management with the right to audit the books, declare strikes and question management methods.

Family Silverware: In case of a new job opening a Semco employee who fulfils 70% of the requirements is treated preferentially over applicants.

Flexitime: There are no fixed working hours at all, each worker decides in his work group on the best schedule.

Headline Memo: Memos are titled with a newspaper-like headline and limited to one page.

Hepatitis Leave: It describes the idea of sabbaticals at Semco, where managers were originally asked to consider the case of contracting hepatitis and being forced to a two-month recuperation time. Professionals can take off a few weeks or months every year or two from their usual duties to learn new skills, redesign their job or simply recharge.

Job Rotation: Managers are encouraged to change jobs, while 25% make use of it. A minimum of two years and a maximum of five years are the norm, while this eventually all depends on the employees.

Job Security: There is no promise on job security.

Lost in Space: It is a programme by Semco, where in a good business year several young people are hired for one year at the entry level. There are no fixed job descriptions, with the only obligation of working in 12 departments in the first 12 months, while possible job offers are negotiated with the departments.

Management by Wandering Around: Department mixing is encouraged, which leads to almost no walls between offices and mixed departments between floors.

Manufacturing Cells: Production teams of workers cluster together to a complete scale giving workers greater autonomy and responsibility, which resulted in greater happiness and productivity. Often they set production quotas and develop improvements for products autonomously and overall in

Natural Business: As a guiding principle everybody should concentrate on the corporate skills of making, selling, billing and collecting. Hence, unnecessary perks such as preference parking, executive dining rooms, fancy office furniture etc. are eliminated.

Nucleus of technological innovation: A small group of mostly engineers without any daily duties free to invent new products, refine old ones, devise market strategies, unearth cost reductions and efficiencies and invent new business lines. Compensation depends partially on their entrepreneurial success.

Paternalism: Employees are not treated like children, but as adults. Hence, everybody is free to choose according to his own interests, while the company is only concerned with job performance, not personal life. For example, health insurance and other benefits are offered but managed by employees, while pools, gyms and sports tracks are not included.

Profit-sharing: The basic percentage to share is agreed upon between Semco and its employees. These are more or less 25%, whose distribution to each worker is organized autonomously.

Reverse Evaluation: Anybody who is hired or promoted must be interviewed, evaluated and promoted by all the people who will work for him. Semco managers are evaluated every 6 months by those he supervises through a special custom multiple choice questionnaire, while the results are made transparent. The average approval rate lays around 80/100 with those scoring below more than three times mostly leaving the company.

Risk salary: In order to have fluctuating labour costs with losses and profits, about a third of the employees may have a fluctuating salary by 25% according to the performance of Semco in that year. If the company performs well, they receive 125% of their normal salary and vice versa.

Rules: No dress codes, no regulation on travels, no working hours, no internal auditing department, no preference parking places. The rule is to use common sense and have as few rules as possible.

Salary surveys: Semco asks their factory and office workers to visit comparable manufacturing companies and interview their counterparts. Thus, no one distrusts the surveys and there is no need for off-the shelf surveys, ultimately creating more trust in the process and findings. The ultimate goal is to have all employees set their own salary.

Satellite Programme: Contracting basic manufacturing by encouraging Semco's own workers to found their own company that can also sell to competitors. They are supported through favourable leasing conditions for production machines, as well as advised on pricing, quality and taxation.

Self-Set Pay: Around 25% of all employees set their own salaries, which is continued to spread throughout the entire company.

Size: A business unit can only function efficiently, if people know almost everyone around them. Hence, they are generally split when they grow above 150 people to diminish alienation and foster co-operation.

Strikes: The following rules are followed during a strike: "1) treat everyone as adults; 2) tell the strikers that no one will be punished when they return; 3) don’t keep the records of who came to work and who led the walkout; 4) never call the police or try to break up a picket line; 5) maintain all benefits; 6) don’t keep workers or union leaders out of the factory; 7) insist that everyone respects the rights of those who want to work; 8) don’t fire anyone during or after the strike."

Support Staff: At Semco everyone copies, faxes, phones and picks-up his guests himself, as secretary jobs have been taken off the payroll.

Training: Instead of formal training programmes, employees are asked to envision their future and are then supported to gain these qualifications through training, which is approved at the weekly business unit meetings.

Transparency: All corporate information is publicly available, such as statistics on salaries, strategies, productivity and profitability. Employees are taught to read financial documents, question managers and talk with the media freely.

Work at home: It is allowed and encouraged, as it enhances concentration, productivity and peoples personal flexibility.

Survival Manual
Authority: Many positions bear authority, yet any sort of negative pressure, fear, insecurity or disrespect caused by exploiting authority is intolerable.

Change: Semco changes a lot, it's a key characteristic considered to be healthy and positive, so do not fear change.

Clothing and Appearance: Feel free to wear whatever you want.

Evaluation by Subordinates: Twice a year you will be asked to evaluate your boss, be frank and honest on paper and also in the following discussion.

Factory Committees: The factory represents the interest of each business unit. Read the charter, participate, make sure your committee effectively defends your interest – which many times will not coincide with Semco's interests. See this conflict as healthy and necessary.

Hiring: Prior to hiring and promoting, other employees in the unit interview and evaluate candidates.

Job Security and Age: Anyone who has been at Semco for three years or is above 50 enjoys special protection, making a long list of approvals necessary, which offers security. Still, everybody can be laid-off.

Participation: The companies philosophy is built on participation and involvement. Engage, give opinions, seek advancement, participate in elections, get in touch with the factory committee, don't just be another employee.

Private Life: A person's private affairs have nothing to do with the company and therefore are of no interest to Semco, given that they do not interfere with work. If help is required, the Human Resource department offers consulting and advice.

Organizational Chart: There is no formal organization chart, as leaders have to earn prior respect to be in their position. In case of utter necessity, the company structure is sketched and afterwards dispensed.

Semco Woman: Semco has various programmes to encourage female participation, as they have lower promotion, employment and financial opportunities in Brazil. If you are a woman, participate and if you are a man, understand and respect it.

Strikes: Workers’ assemblies are sovereign; as such strikes are part of Semco's democracy representing what people in the company feel and think. Absence from work because of strike is considered normal absenteeism.

Suggestions: There are no prizes or rewards for suggestions, as they are an integral part of our business culture.

Unions: Everybody's free to unionize, as they are important to protect our workers. We insist on mutual respect or dialogue, forbidding persecution of union members in any way.

Vacations: Everybody should take his 30 days of vacation every year, they are vital to recover health and recharge. There is no excuse for not using vacation days.

Working Environment: Feel free to change the environment surrounding you, according to your preferences and those who surround you at work.

Working Hours: The responsibility for setting working hours and fulfilling the requirements depends on each employee, as Semco does its best to adapt the working hours to each person's preferences.

References

Business books
Warner Books books
1988 non-fiction books